Rosebank may refer to:

Places

Australia 
 Rosebank, New South Wales

Canada 
 Rosebank, Manitoba

New Zealand 
 Rosebank Peninsula

South Africa 
 Rosebank, Cape Town
 Rosebank, Gauteng

United Kingdom 
 Rosebank, South Lanarkshire, Scotland

United States 
 Rosebank, Staten Island, New York

Train stations 
 Rosebank railway station, in Cape Town, South Africa
 Rosebank (Gautrain station) in Gauteng, South Africa
 Rosebank (Staten Island Railway station), in New York, abandoned

Other uses 
 Rosebank College, in Sydney, Australia
 Rosebank distillery in Scotland
 Rosebank oil and gas field, west of Shetland